A number of elections, both federal and local, took place in Mexico during 2003:

6 July 2003

Federal Congress
Chamber of Deputies – 500 federal deputies

Colima
Governor, state congress, and mayors
See: 2003 Colima state election

Nuevo León
Governor, state congress, and mayors
See: 2003 Nuevo León state election

Sonora
Governor, state congress, and mayors
See: 2003 Sonora state election

7 December 2003

Colima
Re-run of annulled gubernatorial race
See: 2003 Colima state election

See also
Politics of Mexico
List of political parties in Mexico

Elections